Bradtke is a surname. Notable people with the surname include: 

Mark Bradtke (born 1969), Australian basketball player
Nicole Bradtke (born 1969), Australian tennis player, wife of Mark

See also
Radtke